Hormoschista is a monotypic moth genus of the family Erebidae described by Heinrich Benno Möschler in 1890. Its single species, Hormoschista latipalpis, the double-lined brown moth, was first described by Francis Walker in 1858. It is found in eastern North America and the Caribbean.

Taxonomy
The genus has previously been classified in the subfamily Phytometrinae within Erebidae or in the subfamily Acontiinae of the family Noctuidae.

References

Boletobiinae
Noctuoidea genera